The Life Acoustic may refer to:

The Life Acoustic (Everlast album) 
The Life Acoustic (Emil Bulls album)